Center Township is one of the fourteen townships of Carroll County, Ohio, United States. As of the 2020 census there were 4,428 people living in the township, 1,341 of whom lived in the unincorporated portions of the township.

Geography
Located at the center of the county, it borders the following townships:
Washington Township - northeast
Lee Township - southeast
Union Township - southwest
Harrison Township - northwest

The village of Carrollton, the county seat of Carroll County, is located in central Center Township.

Several state highways pass through the township, converging in Carrollton. Ohio State Route 9 leads northeast  to Salem and south  to Cadiz. Ohio State Route 39 crosses OH 9 in Carrollton and leads east  to East Liverpool and west  to New Philadelphia. Ohio State Route 43 leads northwest  to Canton and southeast  to Steubenville, and Ohio State Route 332 leads south  to Scio.

Name and history
It is one of nine Center Townships statewide.

Center Township was not organized as a separate civil township until several years after the organization of Carroll County in March 1836, when the county commissioners had presented them a petition asking for the erection of a separate township to be called "Centre", being composed of parts of Harrison and Washington townships.

Government

The township is governed by a three-member board of trustees, who are elected in November of odd-numbered years to a four-year term beginning on the following January 1. Two are elected in the year after the presidential election and one is elected in the year before it. There is also an elected township fiscal officer, who serves a four-year term beginning on April 1 of the year after the election, which is held in November of the year before the presidential election. Vacancies in the fiscal officership or on the board of trustees are filled by the remaining trustees.

Education
Students attend the Carrollton Exempted Village School District.

References

External links
County website

Townships in Carroll County, Ohio
Townships in Ohio